Jóhan Troest Davidsen (born 31 January 1988) is a Faroese footballer who plays as a centre back for NSÍ Runavík.

Club career
Davidsen started his career with NSÍ Runavík in the Faroe Islands, in 2004 he signed a trainee contract with Premier League club Everton and was part of U19 squad. As he did not succeed in England, he returned to his home country.

In 2006, Jóhan Troest Davidsen went to NSÍ Runavík where he played half a season. The other half of the season Davidsen played for Skála ÍF, after which he returned to NSÍ. In 2007, Davidsen became national champions with NSÍ Runavík.

International career
He has won 33 caps for the Faroe Islands national football team.

Honours
NSÍ Runarvík
Faroe Islands Premier League (1): 2010
HB Tórshavn
Faroe Islands Premier League (1): 2013
Faroe Islands Premier League Defender of the season (2): 2013, 2014
Faroe Islands Premier League Team of the season (2): 2013, 2014

References

External links
 
 

https://www.national-football-teams.com/player/23446/Johan_Troest_Davidsen.html 

Living people
1988 births
Faroese footballers
Faroe Islands international footballers
Association football defenders
Faroese expatriates in Iceland
Fimleikafélag Hafnarfjarðar players
Expatriate footballers in Iceland
Everton F.C. players
Expatriate footballers in England
NSÍ Runavík players
Havnar Bóltfelag players
Skála ÍF players
Faroe Islands youth international footballers
People from Saltangará